Tim Conlon may refer to:

 Tim Conlon (actor), Canadian actor
 Tim Conlon (artist) (born 1974), American artist and graffiti writer